Gian Domenico Borasio (born 9 July 1962 in Novara) is a physician specialist of palliative medicine. He is professor of palliative medicine at the University of Lausanne and head of the Service of Palliative Care of the University Hospital of Lausanne (Switzerland).

Publications

As author
 Über das Sterben. Was wir wissen. Was wir tun können. Wie wir uns darauf einstellen. Beck, Munich 2011.
 Selbstbestimmt sterben. Was es bedeutet. Was uns daran hindert. Wie wir es erreichen können. Beck, Munich 2014.
  Mourir. Ce que l'on sait, ce que l'on peut faire, comment s'y préparer, Presses polytechniques et universitaires romandes, Lausanne, 2014.
  L'autonomie en fin de vie. Le débat allemand, des pistes pour la Suisse, un enjeu pour tous, Presses polytechniques et universitaires romandes, Lausanne, 2017.

As editor
 With Ingeborg Maria Husemeyer: Ernährung bei Schluckstörungen. Eine Sammlung von Rezepten, die das Schlucken erleichtern.
 With Ralf J. Jox, Katja Kühlmeyer: Leben im Koma. Kohlhammer Verlag, Stuttgart 2011.
 With Hans-Joachim Heßler, Ralf J. Jox, Christoph Meier: Patientenverfügung. Das neue Gesetz in der Praxis. Kohlhammer Verlag, Stuttgart 2012.
 With Franz-Joseph Bormann: Sterben. Dimensionen eines anthropologischen Grundphänomens. De Gruyter, Berlin 2012.

Notes and references

External links

 Talk "It's not about dying" (TED, 2014)

Swiss palliative care physicians
Academic staff of the University of Lausanne
1962 births
Living people